Kola Siah (also Romanized as Kolā Sīāh; also known as Kolāh Sīāh) is a village in Band-e Amir Rural District, Zarqan District, Shiraz County, Fars Province, Iran. At the 2006 census, its population was 166, in 43 families.

References 

Populated places in Zarqan County